Gyracanthidae is an family of extinct fish belonging to the class Acanthodii, known from early Devonian to late Carboniferous. Members are characterized by large, broad-based, paired fin spines with the pectoral fin spines having a distinct longitudinal curvature. Although it is originally classified in order Climatiiformes, but later study questioned this.

References
 

Acanthodii
Prehistoric fish families